Teruelictis riparius is an extinct mammalian carnivoran, belonging to the family Mustelidae and was probably related to otters. The animal lived in the Upper Miocene and its fossils have been found in Spain. The animal was probably a terrestrial predator.

The animal is about 60 centimeters long and its dentition is very otter-like. However, the animal does not appear to have been semi-aquatic. Its skeleton was slender and long-legged, unlike that of otters. These conflicting features suggest that the evolutionairy line of otters originated in the Miocene (or even the lower Oligocene) and that the dental morphology of otters developed before the other characteristics of the skeleton did.

References

Prehistoric mustelids
Miocene mustelids
Prehistoric monotypic mammal genera
Miocene mammals of Europe
Fossils of Spain
Fossil taxa described in 2013
Prehistoric carnivoran genera